Thelma is an unincorporated community in Johnson County, Kentucky, United States. The community was originally known as Buskirk, after a local family. But, when the community received its first post office on June 5, 1905, it was renamed Thelma after the daughter of Warren Meek. Meek was a successful pioneer in the newspaper field in the Big Sandy Valley.

Thelma's ZIP code is 41260.

Thelma is located at an elevation of 636 feet.

References

Unincorporated communities in Johnson County, Kentucky
Unincorporated communities in Kentucky